Clint Camilleri  (February 24, 1988) is a Maltese politician, architect and civil engineer, currently serving as Minister for Gozo in the Prime Minister Robert Abela's cabinet of 2020. Among the youngest members of cabinet, Camilleri previously served as a Parliamentary Secretary and a Minister in former Prime Minister Joseph Muscat's cabinet. Prior to becoming a Member of Parliament and Minister, he was the Mayor of Qala in 2017.

Family and education
Clint Camilleri was born on 24 February, 1988, to Anton Camilleri and Marlene née Gauci. Anton served on the Qala local council as a councillor and as Mayor, and was Vice-President of the Gozo Football Association until his death in 2009. Anton's father Anġlu Camilleri was a Labour member of parliament from August 1971 until November 1981. Anton and Anġlu Camilleri, originally from Nadur, were popularly known with the family nickname "Ta' Bedeqq".

Clint Camilleri graduated from the University of Malta in architecture and from the University of Kentucky in civil engineering.

Political career
He began his political career in 2012 elected as the mayor of the Qala Local Council and in 2014 contest in the European Parliament elections but lost. He contested in 2017 as member in the Parliament and won serving the 13th electoral district.

Camilleri served as the Parliamentary Secretary for Agriculture, Fisheries and Animal Rights from 2017 to 2020 and was acting minister for four days.

He succeeded Justyne Caruana, who resigned due to personal issues as the new minister. He is a serving member under the platform of Labour Party.

Personal life
Clint Camilleri is married to Dr. Deborah Camilleri née Mercieca, a lawyer who is Gozo Manager for Transport Malta. They married on 27 May 2018 and have 2 daughters.

Camilleri is a hunter and a member of the hunter's association and lobby group Federation for Hunting & Conservation (FKNK).

References 

1988 births
Living people
Labour Party (Malta) politicians
Government ministers of Malta
Members of the House of Representatives of Malta
People from Gozo
University of Malta alumni
University of Kentucky alumni